Bocconi University School of Law is based at Bocconi University in Milan, Italy, and was formally established in 1999.
The school of law is a consolidation of a pre-existing tradition in legal studies at Bocconi University under the aegis of the "A. Sraffa" Institute of Comparative Law. A formal degree in law has been offered at Bocconi University since 1999.

Bocconi University School of Law currently offers a combined LLB and LLM in Law, participates in the Specialization School for Legal Professions together with the University of Pavia and organises a Summer Academy in cooperation with the University of Trento and the Scuola Superiore Sant'Anna.

Specialization School for Legal Professions
The Specialization School for Legal Professions is a joint venture, established in 2001, between Bocconi University School of Law and the University of Pavia. Courses held at the school are addressed to postgraduate students with a B.Sc. and M.Sc. in Law, and offer preparation courses for the bar, public notary and judiciary exams.

Bocconi Legal Papers
Bocconi Legal Papers is a student-edited working paper series which publishes legal scholarly articles. Established in April 2008 under the name Italian Legal Scholarship Unbound Working Paper Series, the publication was later renamed when its affiliation with Bocconi University School of Law became official.

Bocconi Legal Papers is issued by a student group at Bocconi University School of Law under the supervision of several faculty advisers, and it has also released a citation manual for Italian legal sources under a Creative Commons license.

Bocconi Legal Papers constitutes the first example of a working paper series in the field of student-run legal publications.  This format has been argued to be more in tune with the academic and editorial background of European legal scholarly publishing, which is largely dominated by peer-reviewed journals. Namely, the idea behind this working paper series is to create an additional level of feedback prior to final publication in a journal run by academics, thereby complementing the role of peer-reviewed venues as a showcase for quality scholarship.

Themis
Themis is an academic network joining Bocconi University School of Law with ESADE, Free University Berlin and the University of Paris XII. The network offers the possibility to qualified law students from either of the participant schools to earn, along with a suitable academic qualification from their home university, also an international Themis  certificate, requiring completion of a semester abroad, an internship, and participation in the Themis programme seminar. Students are also required to attend a specified number of courses during a semester spent abroad, at one of the universities of the network.

See also
 List of universities in Italy

References

External links
Bocconi University School of Law - Official Website
Bocconi University - Official International Website
The Specialization School for Legal Professions - Official website of the Specialization School for Legal Professions
Bocconi Legal Papers - Official Website of Bocconi Legal Papers

Law schools in Italy
Educational institutions established in 1999
1999 establishments in Italy